Kim Dong-hyun (born 8 October 1978) is a former professional tennis player from South Korea.

Biography
Kim made his only ATP Tour main draw appearance in the doubles at the 1996 Korea Open, where he partnered with Lee Jong-min to make the semi-finals as wildcards.

In 1997 he began playing for the South Korea Davis Cup team and went on to feature in a total of 10 ties.

During his career he represented South Korea at the Asian Games and Summer Universiade. He was a member of the gold medal winning Korean team at the 1998 Asian Games and won a mixed doubles gold medal at 1999 Summer Universiade.

See also
List of South Korea Davis Cup team representatives

References

External links
 
 
 

1978 births
Living people
South Korean male tennis players
Universiade medalists in tennis
Asian Games gold medalists for South Korea
Asian Games silver medalists for South Korea
Asian Games bronze medalists for South Korea
Asian Games medalists in tennis
Tennis players at the 1998 Asian Games
Medalists at the 1998 Asian Games
Tennis players at the 2002 Asian Games
Medalists at the 2002 Asian Games
Universiade gold medalists for South Korea
Medalists at the 1999 Summer Universiade
Medalists at the 2001 Summer Universiade
20th-century South Korean people